The Republic of Pińczów was an area of Pińczów and the surrounding area which was captured at the end of 1918 for a period of six weeks by the city's inhabitants, led by Jan Lisowski, after the disarmament of the occupation troops without a fight.

History
The city was seized at the end of 1918 after an action carried out by a group of about 150 people, consisting of members of the fire brigade and residents. The group that disarmed the Austro-Hungarian Army's occupation unit consisting of Hungarians without a fight was commanded by Jan Lisowski, an activist of the SDKPiL. As agricultural strikes took place in the powiat, a punitive expedition was sent to Rosiejów (the most inflammatory place), which sent the striking fornals to the farm buildings. The strikers were released after the relief organized by Jan Lisowski. Due to this event, Lisowski was arrested and imprisoned.

There was also a former Austrian officer Kalinka, pseudonym "Kazuń", leading a group spreading socialist and anarchist slogans. This group, based on peasants, carried out several attacks, including in Działoszyce and Wodzisław. The attack on Działoszyce and disarmament of police officers took place on November 12, and on Wodzisław on November 18, 1918. It was carried out by an 18-strong Kalinka unit and a group of several hundred peasants armed with poles and axes. The group committed robberies, but only on rich people. Fearing the actions of the agitated peasants, several landed gentry families left their homes and went to Kielce. Kalinka died in a fight with a punitive army unit in the Piotrków forests.

In 1944, after the liberation from the German occupation of Pińczów and the surrounding area and the seizure of power by partisans from the Peasants' Battalions, the Home Army and the People's Army, a Second Pińczów Republic was established.

See also
Second Republic of Pińczów
Republic of Ostrów
Republic of Ostrowiec
Republic of Tarnobrzeg

References

Bibliography 
 
 
 
 

1918 in Europe
1918 establishments in Poland
1918 disestablishments in Poland
1918 establishments in Austria-Hungary
1918 disestablishments in Austria-Hungary
States and territories established in 1918
States and territories disestablished in 1918
Anarchism in Poland
Socialism in Poland